Burretiodendron tonkinense is a species of flowering plant in the family Malvaceae. It is found in China and Vietnam. It is threatened by habitat loss.

References

tonkinense
Flora of China
Flora of Vietnam
Endangered plants
Taxonomy articles created by Polbot
Plants described in 1960
Taxa named by Auguste Chevalier